A fucosyltransferase is an enzyme that transfers an L-fucose sugar from a GDP-fucose (guanosine diphosphate-fucose) donor substrate to an acceptor substrate.  The acceptor substrate can be another sugar such as the transfer of a fucose to a core GlcNAc (N-acetylglucosamine) sugar as in the case of N-linked glycosylation, or to a protein, as in the case of O-linked glycosylation produced by O-fucosyltransferase.  There are various fucosyltransferases in mammals, the vast majority of which, are located in the Golgi apparatus.  The O-fucosyltransferases have recently been shown to localize to the endoplasmic reticulum (ER).

Some of the proteins in this group are responsible for the molecular basis of the blood group antigens, surface markers on the outside of the red blood cell membrane. Most of these markers are proteins, but some are carbohydrates attached to lipids or proteins [Reid M.E., Lomas-Francis C. The Blood Group Antigen FactsBook Academic Press, London / San Diego, (1997)]. Galactoside 3(4)-L-fucosyltransferase belongs to the Lewis blood group system and is associated with Le(a/b) antigen.

Classification
Glycosyltransferase family 10 CAZY GT_10 comprises enzymes with two known activities; galactoside 3(4)-L-fucosyltransferase and galactoside 3-fucosyltransferase. The galactoside 3-fucosyltransferases display similarities with the alpha-2 and alpha-6-fucosyltranferases. The biosynthesis of the carbohydrate antigen sialyl Lewis X (sLe(x)) is dependent on the activity of an galactoside 3-fucosyltransferase. This enzyme catalyses the transfer of fucose from GDP-beta-fucose to the 3-OH of N-acetylglucosamine present in lactosamine acceptors.

Role in preventing UTIs
Robust fucosyltransferase activity discourages bacterial adherence in the urethra of women. This is also mediated by the presence of few bacterial adhesion sites in the bladder and urethra. Women with these receptors who do not have mucosal secretion of the fucosyltransferase enzyme to help block bacterial adherence are more likely to have colonization of E. coli and other coliforms from the rectum and less likely to have lactobacilli in the periurethral area, resulting in frequent episodes of cystitis.

Human proteins containing this domain 
FUT1; FUT2; FUT3; FUT4; FUT5; FUT6; FUT7; FUT8; FUT9; FUT10; FUT11;

See also
 fucosylation

References

External links
 

Transferases
EC 2.4.1